Hemidactylus inexpectatus is a species of house gecko from Oman.

References

Further reading

Vasconcelos, Raquel, and Salvador Carranza. "Systematics and biogeography of Hemidactylus homoeolepis Blanford, 1881 (Squamata: Gekkonidae), with the description of a new species from Arabia." Zootaxa 3835.4 (2014): 501–527.

External links
Reptile Database

Hemidactylus
Reptiles of the Middle East
Reptiles described in 2012